Gomush Bolagh (also Romanized as Gomūsh Bolāgh; also known as Gomesh Bolāgh and Komesh Bolāgh) is a village in Salehabad Rural District, Salehabad District, Bahar County, Hamadan Province, Iran. At the 2006 census, its population was 319, in 79 families.

References 

Populated places in Bahar County